Margaret Thatcher was Prime Minister of the United Kingdom from 4 May 1979 to 28 November 1990, during which time she led a Conservative majority government. She was the first woman to hold that office. During her premiership, Thatcher moved to liberalise the British economy through deregulation, privatisation, and the promotion of entrepreneurialism.

This article details the first Thatcher ministry she led at the invitation of Queen Elizabeth II from 1979 to 1983.

Formation

Following the vote of no confidence against the Labour government and prime minister James Callaghan on 28 March 1979, a general election was called for 3 May 1979. The Winter of Discontent had seen the Labour government's popularity slump during the previous four months, and the opinion polls all pointed towards a Conservative victory.

The Conservatives won the election with a majority of 44 seats and their leader Margaret Thatcher became the United Kingdom's first female prime minister.

Thatcher inherited some of the worst economic statistics of postwar Britain. The nation was still feeling the effects of the numerous strikes during the recent Winter of Discontent. Inflation had recently topped 20%, and unemployment was in excess of 1.5 million for the first time since the 1930s.

Thatcher's monetarist and deflationary economic policies saw a cut in the inflation rate from a high of 22% in May 1980 to just over 13% by January 1981, and by June 1983 it had fallen to a 15-year low of 4.9%.

Decreasing the public sector borrowing requirement as a share of GDP was a part of the medium term financial strategy at the beginning of the first Thatcher ministry. It was brought down from around 5% during the 1978–1979 period to around half of this figure during the 1982–1983 period.

Public expenditure as a share of GDP increased at around 1.5% per year during the 1979-1983 period, despite the target being a reduction of 1% per year. This increase in spending was mostly driven by larger expenditures in social security programs such as unemployment benefits, industrial support, and increased lending to nationalized industries; defense spending did not go up considerably during the Falklands War.

Long-term unemployment increased considerably during this period: almost one third of the unemployed had been without a job for more than one year. The manufacturing industry was considerably affected during the first Thatcher government: employment in this sector decreased by almost 20% between 1979 and 1982. This decrease drove almost all of the drop in employment for this period.

Productivity started seeing considerable growth during the 1979-1982 period in some industries. Total factor productivity growth during these years was 13.9% in the metal manufacture industry, 6.6% in motor vehicle manufacture, 7.1% in ship and aircraft manufacture, and 7.5% in agriculture.

Income distribution widened considerably during Thatcher's ministry. During the 1979-1986 period, real income per capita fell for the two lower quintiles by 4% and 12% respectively; but for the top three quintiles, it went up by 24%, 11%, and 10%, respectively.

She also oversaw union reforms which saw strikes at their lowest for 30 years by 1983. However, her economic policies also resulted in the loss of much of Britain's heavy industry. Coal pits, steel plants, machine-tools and shipyards were particularly hard hit, most of all in Scotland, Northern Ireland and the north of England. By 1983, unemployment had reached 3.2 million, although economic growth was now re-established following the recession of 1980 and 1981.

The Labour opposition, which changed leader from James Callaghan to Michael Foot in 1980, was in no position to exploit the situation and mount a threat to the Conservative government's power. The change of leader saw the party shift dramatically to the left, and in 1981 a host of disenchanted Labour MPs formed the breakaway Social Democratic Party.  The new party swiftly formed an alliance with the Liberals with a view to forming a coalition government at the next election. Roy Jenkins, leader of the SDP, worked in conjunction with Liberal leader David Steel with the goal of forming a coalition government at the next general election. For a while, opinion polls suggested that this could happen, with support for the Alliance peaking at 50% in late 1981, with both the Tories and Labour faring dismally.

However, when the Falkland Islands (a British colony in the South Atlantic) were seized by Argentine forces in March 1982, Thatcher was swift to declare war on Argentina which was won on 14 June when the Argentines surrendered.  The success of this campaign saw a swift turnaround in support for the Tory government, who by the summer of 1982 was firmly in the lead in all of the major opinion polls. A Conservative victory at the next election appeared inevitable, although it appeared far from clear whether it would be Labour or the Alliance who formed the next opposition.

Fate

Thatcher had the option of waiting until May 1984 before calling a general election, but the opinion polls remained in her favour as 1983 dawned and so she called a general election for 9 June. With all the pollsters pointing towards a Conservative majority, the most interesting outcome of the election was the guessing game as to whether it would be Labour or the Alliance who formed the next opposition.

In the event, the Conservatives were re-elected with a 144-seat majority. The election was an unmitigated disaster for Labour, who polled a mere 27.6% of the vote and were left with just 209 MPs in the new parliament. The Alliance came close to Labour in terms of votes with 25.4% of the electorate voting for them, but won a mere 23 seats.

Cabinets

May 1979 to September 1981
:

Margaret Thatcher – Prime Minister
William Whitelaw – Home Secretary and Deputy Prime Minister
The Lord Soames – Leader of the House of Lords and Lord President of the Council
The Lord Hailsham of St Marylebone – Lord High Chancellor of Great Britain
Sir Geoffrey Howe – Chancellor of the Exchequer
The Lord Carrington – Foreign Secretary
Ian Gilmour – Lord Keeper of the Privy Seal
John Biffen – Chief Secretary to the Treasury
Peter Walker – Minister of Agriculture, Fisheries and Food
Norman St John-Stevas – Leader of the House of Commons and Minister of state for the Arts and Chancellor of the Duchy of Lancaster
Francis Pym – Secretary of State for Defence
Mark Carlisle – Secretary of State for Education
James Prior – Secretary of State for Employment
David Howell – Secretary of State for Energy
Michael Heseltine – Secretary of State for the Environment
Patrick Jenkin – Secretary of State for Health and Social Security
Keith Joseph – Secretary of State for Industry
Humphrey Atkins – Secretary of State for Northern Ireland
Angus Maude – Paymaster General
George Younger – Secretary of State for Scotland
John Nott – Secretary of State for Trade and President of the Board of Trade
Nicholas Edwards – Secretary of State for Wales

Changes
January 1981
Francis Pym succeeded Norman St John-Stevas as Chancellor of the Duchy of Lancaster and Leader of the House of Commons.  Pym succeeded Angus Maude as Paymaster-General.
John Nott succeeded Francis Pym as Secretary of State for Defence. John Biffen succeeded Nott as Secretary of State for Trade and President of the Board of Trade.
Leon Brittan succeeded John Biffen as Chief Secretary to the Treasury.
Norman St John-Stevas resigned as Minister for the Arts.  His successor was not in the Cabinet.
the post of Secretary of State for Transport was brought into the Cabinet and Norman Fowler was given the post.

September 1981 to June 1983
:

In September 1981, a substantial reshuffle took place.
Margaret Thatcher – Prime Minister
William Whitelaw – Home Secretary and Deputy Prime Minister
Francis Pym – Leader of the House of Commons and Lord President of the Council
The Lord Hailsham of St Marylebone – Lord High Chancellor of Great Britain
Sir Geoffrey Howe – Chancellor of the Exchequer
The Lord Carrington – Foreign Secretary
Humphrey Atkins – Lord Keeper of the Privy Seal
Leon Brittan – Chief Secretary to the Treasury
Peter Walker – Minister of Agriculture, Fisheries and Food
John Nott – Secretary of State for Defence
Keith Joseph – Secretary of State for Education
Norman Tebbit – Secretary of State for Employment
Nigel Lawson – Secretary of State for Energy
Michael Heseltine – Secretary of State for the Environment
Norman Fowler – Secretary of State for Health and Social Security
Patrick Jenkin – Secretary of State for Industry
The Baroness Young – Leader of the House of Lords and Chancellor of the Duchy of Lancaster
James Prior – Secretary of State for Northern Ireland
Cecil Parkinson – Paymaster General
George Younger – Secretary of State for Scotland
John Biffen – Secretary of State for Trade and President of the Board of Trade
David Howell – Secretary of State for Transport
Nicholas Edwards – Secretary of State for Wales

Changes
April 1982
Francis Pym succeeded Lord Carrington as Foreign Secretary. John Biffen succeeded Pym as Lord President of the Council.
Baroness Young succeeded Humphrey Atkins as Lord Keeper of the Privy Seal. Cecil Parkinson succeeded Young as Chancellor of the Duchy of Lancaster.
Lord Cockfield succeeded John Biffen as Secretary of State for Trade.
January 1983Michael Heseltine succeeded John Nott as Secretary of State for Defence. Tom King succeeded Heseltine as Secretary of State for the Environment.

List of ministers
Members of the Cabinet are in bold face.

Notes

References
Citations

Bibliography

Government
1970s in the United Kingdom
1979 establishments in the United Kingdom
1980s in the United Kingdom
1983 disestablishments in the United Kingdom
Ministry 1
Ministries of Elizabeth II
British ministries
Cabinets established in 1979
Cabinets disestablished in 1983

pl:Drugi rząd Margaret Thatcher
pl:Trzeci rząd Margaret Thatcher